Cassell's National Library was a weekly series issued by Cassell & Company of London, comprising English literature edited by Henry Morley. From 1886 to 1889 it issued 209 weekly volumes. These were sold for 3d. in paper covers and 6d. cloth-bound, roughly equivalent to $4.50 and $9.00 in 2020 US dollars.

Morley also edited the monthly series Morley's Universal Library issued by George Routledge & Sons from 1883 to 1888.

References

External links 

 Publication Series: Cassell's National Library at the Internet Speculative Fiction Database

Books about literature
British books
Cassell (publisher) books
English-language literature
Series of books
Book series introduced in 1889